American goulash, sometimes called slumgullion, is an American comfort food dish, similar to American chop suey. American goulash is usually referred to in the midwestern and southern United States as simply "goulash". As a descendant, of sorts, of Hungarian goulash, the only real connection seems to be the name, and the inclusion of beef and paprika.

History and typical preparation
American goulash, mentioned in cookbooks since at least 1914, exists in a number of variant recipes. Originally a dish of seasoned beef, core ingredients of American goulash now usually include various kinds of pasta, usually macaroni or egg noodles,  ground beef cooked with any number of aromatics, usually onions and garlic, along with tomatoes of some sort, whether canned tomatoes (whole, diced, or crushed are all common variants), tomato sauce, or tomato paste. Some variations of American goulash include cheese.

See also

 Goulash (Hungarian goulash)
 American chop suey
 Johnny Marzetti
 Hamburger Helper
 List of casserole dishes
 List of pasta dishes
 List of regional dishes of the United States

References

Casserole dishes
Cuisine of the Midwestern United States
Hungarian-American cuisine
American pasta dishes
American meat dishes
Ground meat